Mercersville may refer to a location in the United States:

Mercersville, Maryland
Mercer, North Carolina, formerly called Mercersville